GW 190814 was a gravitational wave (GW) signal observed by the LIGO and Virgo detectors on 14 August 2019 at 21:10:39 UTC, and having a signal-to-noise ratio of 25 in the three-detector network. The signal was associated with the astronomical superevent S190814bv, located 790 million light years away, in location area 18.5 deg2 towards Cetus or Sculptor. No optical counterpart was discovered despite an extensive search of the probability region.

Discovery

In June 2020, astronomers reported details of a compact binary merging, in the "mass gap" of cosmic collisions, of a first-ever  "mystery object", either an extremely heavy neutron star (that was theorized not to exist) or a too-light black hole, with a  black hole, that was detected as the gravitational wave GW190814.

The mass of the lighter component is estimated to be 2.6 times the mass of the Sun ( ≈ ), placing it in the aforementioned mass gap between neutron stars and black holes.

Despite an intensive search, no optical counterpart to the gravitational wave was observed. The lack of emitted light could be consistent with either a situation in which a black hole entirely consumed a neutron star or the merger of two black holes.

See also
 Gravitational-wave astronomy
 List of gravitational wave observations
 Multi-messenger astronomy

Notes

References

External links
 
  (24 June 2020; Science Fellow)
  (24 June 2020; LIGO Scientific Collaboration)
  (23 June 2020; Max Planck Institute for Gravitational Physics)
  (23 June 2020; Gravitational-wave Open Science Center (GWOSC))

Black holes
Gravitational waves
Neutron stars
Theory of relativity
August 2019 events
2019 in science
2019 in space